Elizabeth Draper may refer to:

Eliza Draper, subject of Journal to Eliza by Laurence Sterne 
Betty Draper, Elizabeth Draper, fictional character in TV series, Mad Men